Milhamoth ha-Shem or Milhamoth Adonai (Wars of the Lord) is the title of several Hebrew polemical texts.

Milhamoth ha-Shem of Salmon ben Jeroham, 10th century
Solomon ben Jeroham's The Book of the Wars of the Lord (also Milhamoth Adonai מלחמות אדוני), is a refutation of Saadya Gaon.

Milhamoth ha-Shem of Jacob ben Reuben, 12th century
The Milhamoth ha-Shem of Jacob ben Reuben, is a 12th-century Jewish apologia against conversion by Christians, consisting of questions and answers from selected texts of Gospel of Matthew, including Matt. 1:1–16, 3:13–17, 4:1–11, 5:33–40, 11:25–27, 12:1–8, 26:36–39, 28:16–20. It served as a precedent for the full Hebrew translation and interspersed commentary on Matthew found in Ibn Shaprut's Touchstone c. 1385.

Milhamoth ha-Shem of Abraham, son of Maimonides, 13th century
Abraham ben Moses ben Maimon's Wars of the Lord is a treatise defending his father Maimonides against slander.

Milhamoth ha-Shem of Nachmanides, 13th century
Nachmanides's Wars of the Lord is a Halakhic treatise attacking Zerahiah ha-Levi's commentary on Alfasi. The treatise goes in great detail on the piece of Talmud at hand.

Milhamoth ha-Shem of Levi ben Gershom, 14th century
The Wars of the Lord, also Milhamoth Adonai (מלחמות אדוני), of Levi ben Gershom, or Gersonides, or "RaLBaG", (1288–1344) is a religious, astronomical and philosophical treatise.

Milhamoth ha-Shem of Abner of Burgos (Alfonso of Valladolid), 14th century.
Abner of Burgos (ca1260-ca1347)  was a convert to Christianity who wrote polemical works in Hebrew between 1320–1340. This text is Hebrew anti-Jewish polemic that is now lost but quotations of it survive in the Latin writing of the fifteenth-century convert Paul of Burgos (Scrutinium Scripturarum) and the polemicist Alonso de Espina (Fortalitium fidei). It served as a template for Abner's later work ʾMoreh Zedek, which now survives in a Castilian translation as Mostrador de justicia and much material from the Sefer is repeated there. Abner translated the work into Castilian himself at the behest of Blanca, Lady of Las Huelgas in Burgos around the year 1320, and a copy of this translation was seen by traveller Ambrosio de Morales in Valladolid in the 16th century.

Milhamoth ha-Shem of Yiḥyeh Qafeḥ, 1931
The seminal work composed by Yiḥyeh Qafeḥ, Chief Rabbi of Sana'a, Yemen and protagonist of the Dor Deah movement in Orthodox Judaism. Qafeḥ's Milḥamot HaShem (1931), which he began to write in 1914, argues that the Zohar is not authentic.

References

Jewish apologetics
Medieval Jewish history
Jewish medieval literature